The railway from Rennes to Saint-Malo is a regional railway line between Rennes and Saint-Malo in Ille-et-Vilaine, western France.

Route
These are the main stations:

The line begins in Rennes station, then passes the Dol-de-Bretagne station, and ends in Saint-Malo station.

Line history
The line opened on June 27, 1864.

References

Railway lines in Brittany